KUTC (95.7 FM) is an American radio station broadcasting a Classic rock format. It is licensed to Gunnison, Utah, and serves central Utah. The station is owned by Sanpete County Broadcasting Company.

History
The station was assigned the call letters KIPP on March 23, 1989. On July 18, 1989, the station changed its call sign to KLGG and on August 11, 1993 to KFMD, on June 6, 1998, the station became KZEZ, on May 29, 2001, it became KMGR, and on April 19, 2017 became KUTC.

References

External links

UTC
Radio stations established in 1990
1990 establishments in Utah
Classic rock radio stations in the United States